The United States Air Force's 228th Combat Communications Squadron (228 CBCS) is an Air National Guard combat communications unit located at McGhee-Tyson ANGB, Tennessee.

Mission

History

Assignments

Major Command/Gaining Command 
Air National Guard/Air Combat Command (1 Jun 1992 – present)
Air National Guard/Tactical Air Command (16 Oct 1971 – 1 Jun 1992)

Wing/Group 
226th Combat Communications Group (1971 – present)

Previous designations 
 228th Combat Communications Squadron (???-Present)
 228th Mobile Communications Squadron (Contingency) (16 October 1971-???)

Bases stationed 
McGhee-Tyson ANGB, Tennessee (1971 – present)

Equipment Operated 
TRC-170
TSC-85C
TSC-94
PSC-5D

Awards and decorations 
Air Force Outstanding Unit Award (AFOUO):1 January 1976 – 31 December 1977;1 January – 31 December 1990;1 September 1997 – 31 August 1999;

References

External links 

Combat Communications 0228
Combat Communications 0228
Military units and formations in Tennessee